Mascara is a province (wilaya) in Algeria. It was named after its capital, whose name is Arabic for "military garrison", and which is unrelated to "mascara", the cosmetic. Another important locality is the town of Sig.

History
The province was created from parts of Mostaganem department and Oran (department) in 1974.

Administrative divisions
The province is divided into 16 districts (daïras), which are further divided into 47 communes or municipalities.

Districts

 Aïn Farès
 Aïn Fekan
 Aouf
 Bouhanifia
 El Bordj
 Ghriss
 Hachem
 Mascara
 Mohammedia
 Oggaz
 Ouled Attia
 Oued Taria
 Sig
 Tighenif
 Tizi
 Zahana

Communes

 Aïn Fares
 Aïn Fekan
 Aïn Ferah
 Aïn Fras
 Alaimia
 Aouf
 Beniane
 Bou Hanifia
 Bou Henni
 Chorfa
 El Bordj
 El Gaada
 El Ghomri
 Hachem
 El Keurt
 El Menaouer
 Ferraguig
 Froha
 Gharrous
 Guerdjoum
 Guittena 
 Ghriss    
 Mamounia
 Hacine
 Khalouia
 Makdha
 Maoussa
 Mascara
 Matemore
 Mocta Douz
 Mohammadia
 Nesmoth
 Oggaz
 Oued El Abtal
 Oued Taria
 Ras Ain Amirouche
 Sedjerara
 Sehaîlia
 Sidi Abdeldjebar
 Sidi Abdelmoumen
 Sidi Kada
 Sidi Boussaid
 Sig
 Tighennif
 Tizi
 Zahana
 Zelameta

1994 earthquake
There was an earthquake in the capital of Mascara City on 18 August 1994. The 5.9 Mw oblique-slip shock left 159 dead, 289 injured, and 8,000–10,000 homeless.

Notable people 
 Emir Abdelkader (1808–1883)
 Emir Mustapha (1814 – 1863)

References

 
Provinces of Algeria
States and territories established in 1974